The 2022 FIBA Africa Women's Champions Cup will be the 26th season of the FIBA Africa Women's Clubs Champions Cup, the top tier basketball league for women's teams in Africa. The  tournament began on December 9 and will end on December 17, 2022, and will be entirely hosted in the Eduardo Mondlane University Gym in Maputo, the capital of Mozambique. It is the third time Maputo hosts the league after 2016 and 2018. The league returns after a 2-year hiatus due to the COVID-19 pandemic.

Sporting Alexandria won their first continental title, after beating Costa do Sol in the finals, becoming the first Egyptian team to win the competition.

Teams 
Before the competitions 10 teams have successfully qualified. OverDose Up Station from Cameroon was forced to withdraw.

Format 
The ten teams are divided in two groups of five. The first four qualify for the play-offs which are all played in single-elimination games.

Group phase

Group A

Group B

Play-offs

Semi-finals

Third place game

Final

All-Tournament Team 
The all-tournament team and Most Valuable Player were announced after the final.

  Hagar Amer (Sporting Alexandria) – MVP
  Reem Moussa (Sporting Alexandria)
  Ingvild Mucauro (Costa do Sol)
  Eleuteria Lhavanguane (Costa do Sol)
  Ifunaya Okoro (KPA)

References 

FIBA Africa Women's Clubs Champions Cup
2022 in women's basketball
2022 in African basketball